Fuculose or 6-deoxy-tagatose is a ketohexose deoxy sugar. Fuculose is involved in the process of sugar metabolism. -Fuculose can be formed from -fucose by -fucose isomerase and converted to L-fuculose-1-phosphate by -fuculose kinase.

See also 
 -fuculose-phosphate aldolase
 -fuculosekinase

References

Deoxy sugars
Ketohexoses